"Jam for the Ladies" is a song by American electronica musician Moby. It was released as the sixth and final single from his sixth studio album 18 on July 21, 2003. The song features guest vocals from rapper MC Lyte and R&B singer Angie Stone and incorporates a vocal sample from "Wherever You Are" by Mic Geronimo. The single version is a collaboration with American rapper Princess Superstar. In reference to its number of collaborators, Moby has described "Jam for the Ladies" as a "crowded song". The song's music video was directed by Simon and Jon and later included on 18 B Sides + DVD.

Track listing
 CD single 
 "Jam for the Ladies"  – 3:05
 "Jam for the Ladies"  – 5:00
 "Jam for the Ladies"  – 7:46
 "Jam for the Ladies"  – 3:03
 "Jam for the Ladies"  – 7:04
 "Bed" – 4:18
 "Ace Love" – 5:49

 12-inch single 
 "Jam for the Ladies"  – 7:46
 "Jam for the Ladies"  – 5:00
 "Jam for the Ladies"  – 7:04
 "Jam for the Ladies"  – 3:03
 "Jam for the Ladies"  – 3:05

Charts

References

External links
 

2003 singles
Moby songs
Princess Superstar songs
Song recordings produced by Moby
2002 singles
Mute Records singles
Songs written by Angie Stone
Songs written by Princess Superstar
Songs written by MC Lyte